Phyllonorycter obscuricostella is a moth of the family Gracillariidae. It is known from Connecticut, Illinois, Kentucky, Pennsylvania, Maine and New York in the United States.

The wingspan is 6-6.5 mm.

The larvae feed on Ostrya species, including Ostrya virginiana and Ostrya virginica. They mine the leaves of their host plant. The mine has the form of a small tentiform mine on the underside of the leaf. They are usually located between two veins. The pupa is formed inside of a thin silken web which occupies an entire half of the mine.

References

External links
mothphotographersgroup
Phyllonorycter at microleps.org

obscuricostella
Moths of North America
Moths described in 1859